Seabrook Island, formerly known as Simmons Island, is a barrier island in Charleston County, South Carolina, United States. The population was 1,714 at the 2010 census, up from 1,250 in 2000.

Seabrook Island is part of the Charleston-North Charleston-Summerville metropolitan area.

Geography
Seabrook Island is located in southwestern Charleston County at  (32.582173, -80.163332), bordered to the south by the Atlantic Ocean, to the west by the North Edisto River, and to the north by Bohicket Creek. To the east along the Atlantic shoreline as far as the Kiawah River, across which is the town of Kiawah Island. Most of the eastern border of the town, however, is next to unincorporated land.

Geography and climate

The Köppen Climate Classification System rates the climate of Seabrook Island as humid subtropical.[12] Ocean breezes tend to moderate the island climate, as compared to the nearby mainland were daytime highs are higher and nighttime lows are lower. Daytime mean highs in winter range from 55 to 60 °F (13 to 16 °C), with nighttime lows averaging 43 to 50 °F (6 to 10 °C). Summertime mean highs are 85 to 88 °F (29 to 31 °C), with average lows 74 to 76 °F (23 to 24 °C). Average rainfall is 48 inches per year. Accumulation of snow/ice is rare. The island is located borderline USDA Plant Hardiness Zone 8b/9a.

History
In 1666, British subject Lt. Col. Robert Sanford arrived on Seabrook as an explorer in royal service to King Charles II. By 1684, the local Stono Indians were persuaded to cede their lands to the proprietary government, which in turn sold the property to English settlers.

During the American Revolutionary years, the island was used as a staging area for Hessian and British troops during the Siege of Charleston. In 1816, the island was sold to William Seabrook of nearby Edisto Island, hence the present name. Under Seabrook's ownership, the island was used for growing cotton. At the height of the Civil War, Seabrook sold the island to William Gregg, who rented the land to Charles Andell.

After the turn of the century, the island was sold to sportsmen for hunting, fishing, and recreation. In 1939, the Episcopal Diocese of South Carolina rented land on Seabrook to establish a summer camp for underprivileged children.

Eighteen years later, the town of Seabrook was incorporated, and it celebrated a decade of private ownership and self-government in 1997.

In 2005 Seabrook Island Club  membership became a requirement for new purchasers of property on Seabrook. This requirement raised the economic growth and vitality of the Island, resulting in a strong financial positions for the Seabrook Island Club. In 2010 the Horizon Plan, a complete reconstruction of island amenities, was completed, providing property owners and guests with a new fitness/community center, racquet club, full-service clubhouse, beach club and renovated equestrian center, pools and golf practice facility.

The switch to mandatory membership has been controversial with some owners contending that the requirement has depressed real estate sales and prices.

Seabrook Island amenities include two championship golf courses, nationally recognized racquet club with 15 Har Tru tennis courts and two pickleball courts, equestrian center offering trail and beach rides, ocean-front dining venues, swimming pools, fitness center and expansive banquet/private dining venues.

Demographics

2020 census

As of the 2020 United States census, there were 2,050 people, 951 households, and 703 families residing in the town.

2000 census
As of the census of 2000, there were 1,250 people, 660 households, and 465 families residing in the town. The population density was 206.0 people per square mile (79.5/km2). There were 1,649 housing units at an average density of 271.7 per square mile (104.9/km2). The racial makeup of the town was 97.04% White, 1.44% African American, 0.40% Native American, 0.08% Asian, 0.40% Pacific Islander, 0.32% from other races, and 0.32% from two or more races. Hispanic or Latino of any race were 0.88% of the population.

There were 660 households, out of which 3.6% had children under the age of 18 living with them, 68.2% were married couples living together, 2.3% had a female householder with no husband present, and 29.4% were non-families. 24.8% of all households were made up of individuals, and 11.8% had someone living alone who was 65 years of age or older. The average household size was 1.86 and the average family size was 2.14.

In the town, the population was spread out, with 3.0% under the age of 18, 3.1% from 18 to 24, 11.8% from 25 to 44, 40.9% from 45 to 64, and 41.2% who were 65 years of age or older. The median age was 62 years. For every 100 females, there were 89.7 males. For every 100 females age 18 and over, there were 89.2 males.

The median income for a household in the town was $66,548, and the median income for a family was $84,392. Males had a median income of $50,446 versus $40,000 for females. The per capita income for the town was $49,863. About 2.1% of families and 3.8% of the population were below the poverty line, including none of those under age 18 and 4.6% of those age 65 or over.

Government 
The city is run by an elected mayor–council government system.

Mayor
John Gregg

Town Council Members
Skip Crane, Jeri Finke, Patricia Fox and Barry Goldstein

References

External links
 Town of Seabrook Island official website
Seabrook Island website
https://tidelinesblog.com/, Tidelines, the Community Blog of Seabrook Island
 The Island Connection, bi-weekly newspaper serving Seabrook and Kiawah Island

Towns in Charleston County, South Carolina
Towns in South Carolina
Charleston–North Charleston–Summerville metropolitan area
Populated coastal places in South Carolina